This is a list of the banks that are currently incorporated in Cyprus .

Central bank
Central Bank of Cyprus

Commercial banks

Branches of foreign banks in Cyprus

Representative offices of foreign banks in Cyprus
Bank Zenit

Defunct banks
Cyprus Cooperative Bank (merged with Hellenic Bank in July 2018)
Cyprus Popular Bank (currently subject to resolution, prohibited from assuming any new obligations to the public)
USB Bank (merged with AstroBank in January 2019)
RCB Bank (ceased banking operations to become an asset management company)

References

External links 

Banks
Cyprus
Cyprus
Cyprus
+